Field inventory management commonly known as inventory management is the function of understanding the stock mix of a company and the different demands on that stock. The demands are influenced by both external and internal factors and are balanced by the creation of purchase order requests to keep supplies at a reasonable or prescribed level. Inventory management is important for every other business enterprise.

Retail supply chain
Inventory management in the retail supply chain follows the following sequence:

 Request for new stock from stores to head office,
 Head office issues purchase orders to the vendor,
 Vendor ships the goods,
 Warehouse receives the goods,
 Warehouse stores and distributes to the stores,
 Shops and/or consumers (e.g. wholesale shops) receive the goods,
 Goods are sold to customers at the shops.

Software applications
SaaS inventory management software is a tool to help efficiently manage stock. While the capabilities of applications vary, most inventory management applications give organizations a structured method of accounting for all incoming and outgoing inventory within their facilities. Organizations may save costs associated with manual inventory counts, administrative errors and reductions in inventory stock-outs.

Often tracking stock just through sales and returns is not enough for retailers and does not meet the demands of customers multichannel expectations. Customers expect retailers to have real-time knowledge of stock availability. This can be a challenge for retailers who may have on-line as well as bricks and mortar outlets.

A good inventory management system will be able to list all stock options with a size colour matrix as well as give live reports on best or worst sellers, supply chain and sales staff.

Many large organizations use sophisticated ERP systems such as Oracle EBS and SAP for inventory management. Stock modules in these ERP systems provide many of the options needed to manage inventory.

The stock size needs to correspond to the amount of products which are sold. If the stock is too large (especially with perishable goods as fruit, vegetables, ...) there is a risk of financial losses as some of the inventory may spoil while sitting in the store. To reduce this risk (and keep financial losses as small as possible), there is hence benefit in precisely recording the weekly purchases of the shop's customers. This can be done through purchases tracking per individual shopper.

See also

 Supply chain management
 Document automation
 Warehouse management system
 Storage management system
 Automated identification and data capture
 Economic order quantity
 Economic lot scheduling problem
 Newsvendor model
 Vendor-managed inventory
 Scan-based trading

References

Inventory
Corporate development